The San Diego Fire-Rescue Department (SDFD) provides fire protection and emergency medical services to the city of San Diego, California, United States. The San Diego Fire-Rescue Department is the second-largest municipal fire department in the state of California, after Los Angeles and responds to nearly 130,000 calls per year.

Organization
The San Diego Fire-Rescue Department is divided into two major divisions: Emergency Operations and Support Services. Each of these divisions are commanded by an assistant chief who oversees several subdivisions.

Helicopters
In the summer of 2002, the SDFD acquired a Bell 212HP with a  water capacity. In 2005, the department acquired a Bell 412EP for their fleet. The two helicopters are known by their call signs Copter 1 and Copter 2, respectively. They are most commonly used during wildfires for helitack. They can also be used as air ambulances to lift injured personnel. On December 13, 2017 The City Council approved the purchase of one Sikorsky S-70i FireHawk Helicopter for $9.8 million. This will bring the number of Helicopters San Diego Fire-Rescue Department has to 3. The Council also approved using bond revenues to fund a $13.7 million hangar for its helicopters that will include living and office space. The facility will be built at Montgomery-Gibbs Executive Airport.

Operations
The San Diego Fire-Rescue Department operates out of 52 fire stations, located throughout the city, organized into seven battalions. Each Battalion is commanded by a Battalion Chief.

The San Diego Fire-Rescue Department also operates 25 lifeguard stations, nine of which are permanently staffed. SDFD recently purchased many new Pierce Pumpers and 4 New Pierce Arrow XT Tractor Drawn Aerials. Trucks 1 and 35 are already in Service. The next two are expected to go to Truck 21 and Truck 12

There are two additional locations: There is an Air Operations Base and an Emergency Command and Dispatch Center.

Battalion 1
Battalion 1 is responsible for the following Fire Stations: 1,2,3,4,7,11 and the ARFF Station at San Diego Airport. Battalion 1 is Headquartered at Fire Station 2.

Battalion 2
Battalion 2 is responsible for the following Fire Stations: 5,8,14,18,23,28 and 36. Battalion 2 is Headquartered at Fire Station 5.

Battalion 3
Battalion 3 is responsible for the following Fire Stations: 15,20,21,22,25 and 27. Battalion 3 is Headquartered at Fire Station 25.

Battalion 4
Battalion 4 is responsible for the following Fire Stations: 10,17,26,31,34,39 and 45. Battalion 4 is Headquartered at Fire Station 45.

Battalion 5
Battalion 5 is responsible for the following Fire Stations: 9,13,16,24,35,41,47 and 50. Battalion 5 is Headquartered at Fire Station 50.

Battalion 6
Battalion 6 is responsible for the following Fire Stations: 6,12,19,29,30,32,43,51 and 55. Battalion 6 is Headquartered at Fire Station 12.

Battalion 7
Battalion 7 is responsible for the following Fire Stations: 33,37,38,40,42,44,46 and 57. Battalion 7 is Headquartered at Fire Station 44

Low staffing issues

The San Diego Fire Department is somewhat understaffed compared to comparable fire departments. For example, the fire department has about one firefighter per 1469 residents, compared to one fire fighter per 421 residents in San Francisco. In comparison with other major cities with populations over 1 million, such as Los Angeles, the starting pay for a City of San Diego Fire Fighter is around $80,000.

References

External links

Official Website
General Information
Fire/EMS image collection

Fire departments in California
Fire Department
Ambulance services in the United States
Medical and health organizations based in California